Used bookstores (usually called "second-hand bookshops" in Great Britain) buy and sell used books and out-of-print books. A range of titles is available in used bookstores, including in print and out-of-print books. Book collectors tend to frequent used book stores. Large online bookstores offer used books for sale, too. Individuals wishing to sell their used books using online bookstores agree to terms outlined by the bookstore(s): for example, paying the online bookstore(s) a predetermined commission once the books have sold.

Used bookstores can range in size offering from several hundred to several hundred thousands of titles. They may be brick-and-mortar stores, internet-only stores, or a combination of both. A book town is a locale where numerous bookstores are located and serve as the town's main attraction to tourists.

The third largest bookstore chain in the United States, Half Price Books, primarily sells and buys used books along with new titles.

See also
Antiquarian book trade in the United States
Bookstore tourism
List of used book conditions

Religious bookstore

References

Further reading
 Brown, Richard & Brett, Stanley. The London Bookshop. Pinner, Middlesex: Private Libraries Association, 1977 
 Chambers, David. English Country Bookshops. Pinner, Middlesex: Private Libraries Association, 2010 

Bookstores
Bookselling
Reuse